Bethanie Mattek-Sands and Coco Vandeweghe were the defending champions, but chose not to participate together. Mattek-Sands played alongside Lucie Šafářová, but lost in the semifinals to Chan Yung-jan and Martina Hingis. Vandeweghe teamed up with Shelby Rogers, but lost in the first round to Andreja Klepač and María José Martínez Sánchez. 

Chan and Hingis went on to win the title, defeating Lucie Hradecká and Kateřina Siniaková in the final, 7–6(7–4), 6–2.

Seeds

Draw

Finals

Top half

Bottom half

References
 Main Draw

BNP Paribas Open – Women's Doubles
2017 BNP Paribas Open